John Livingston Weinberg (January 25, 1925 – August 7, 2006) was an American banker and businessperson, running Goldman Sachs from 1976 to 1990.

Early life 
Weinberg was the son of Sidney Weinberg, a banker at Goldman Sachs, and was born and grew up in the Westchester County suburb of Scarsdale. He was educated at Deerfield Academy. He graduated with an A.B. in economics from Princeton University in 1948 after completing a senior thesis titled "Status and Functions of Corporate Directors." He then attended Harvard Business School. He had served as a lieutenant in the U.S. Marines in World War II and was recalled for the Korean War.

Career
He joined Goldman Sachs in 1950 and rose to become a senior investment banker and chairman of the management committee, running the firm from 1976 to 1990. At Goldman, he resisted taking the firm public, and during his tenure, Goldman refused to work on hostile takeovers.

He was a director of the Seagram drinks group, newspaper publisher Knight-Ridder, and the chemical firm Du Pont. He was a trustee of Princeton and New York-Presbyterian Hospital. He endowed the Weinberg Center for Corporate Governance at the University of Delaware.

He hired a man to keep his name and his firm's out of the press, and kept him off the full-time payroll (though he sat full-time at a desk in head office) so that if, improbably, a comment did slip out, it could be honestly dismissed as not coming from a Goldman Sachs employee.

Family and death
He died of complications following a fall at the age of 81. He and his wife Sue Ann Gotshal, daughter of Sylvan Gotshal (1897–1968), lived in Greenwich, Connecticut, and had two children, and five grandchildren. His son followed family tradition with Goldman Sachs and was vice chairman from June 2006 to October 6, 2015. John L. Weineberg's son, John S. Weinberg joined Goldman in 1983, made partner in 1992, and then served as vice chairman of Goldman Sachs Group Inc. from 2006 to 2015. He joined Evercore in 2016, becoming their Chairman of the Board, in 2020, he became CEO.

References 

1925 births
2006 deaths
American corporate directors
American investment bankers
Jewish American military personnel
United States Marine Corps personnel of the Korean War
United States Marine Corps personnel of World War II
Businesspeople from New York (state)
Chairmen of Goldman Sachs
Chief Executive Officers of Goldman Sachs
Deerfield Academy alumni
Harvard Business School alumni
People from Scarsdale, New York
Princeton University alumni
United States Marines
20th-century American businesspeople
20th-century American Jews
21st-century American Jews